Flesberg Stave Church is a stave church located at Flesberg in Viken county, Norway.

History 

Written sources mention the church the first time in 1359, but it was probably built in the latter half of the 1100s or the first half of the 1200s.
The church was originally a single nave church (type B) with four free-standing internal posts bearing a raised central roof, surrounded by an ambulatory or aisles on all four sides. It had a narrower chancel, also with a raised central roof, and a semicircular apse. It was surrounded by a gallery loosely connected to the plank walls.

In 1735, the chancel and apse, as well as the east wall of the nave, were removed. The nave was extended eastwards and two transepts were added, making a cruciform plan. The additions were built in horizontal log construction with notched corners.  Portal planks are decorated with carved vines and animal ornamentation. Since few parts of the stave church are preserved, there are only scant remnants of its original decor. Of the original stave church, only three outer walls survived, as the internal posts and the raised roof were eliminated.

The churchyard is fenced with slate brought from Haukeli farm on the west bank of the Lågen River.  Some slates have iron rings affixed; these rings were used to tether horses during service. Each farmer had a designated ring for his horse (the oldest dated ring from 1661). The idiosyncratic stone fence is shown on a 1701 painting (the oldest existing painting of a stave church).

The interior of the church is characterized by the reconstruction of 1735. There are a few remains of medieval furnishings. There is a decorated lion and a lionhead that also originates in the Middle Ages. Underneath the whitewashed walls, decorative paintings from the Middle Ages were uncovered.

Gallery

References

Related reading 
 Leif Anker (2005) The Norwegian Stave Churches (Oslo: Arfo Forlag) 
 Roar Hauglid (1970) Norwegian Stave Churches (Oslo: Dreyers Forlag)

External links 
 Flesberg Stave Church, Directorate for Cultural Heritage – in Norwegian
 Flesberg Stave Church in Stavkirke.org  – in Norwegian
 Flesberg Stave Church in a video about churches in Numedal – in English

12th-century churches in Norway
Churches in Viken
Stave churches in Norway
Churches completed in 1200